Kevin Roy (born May 20, 1993) is a Canadian professional ice hockey forward who is currently playing with the Laval Rocket in the American Hockey League (AHL). Roy was selected by the Anaheim Ducks in the 4th round (97th overall) of the 2012 NHL Entry Draft. He played with the NCAA Men's Division I Northeastern Huskies in the Hockey East conference from 2012 to 2016.

Playing career
As a youth, Roy played in the 2005 Quebec International Pee-Wee Hockey Tournament with a minor ice hockey team from Saint-Laurent.

Roy attended Northeastern University, where he skated with the Northeastern Huskies men's ice hockey team since the 2012–13 season. In his freshman season Roy was honoured when he was named to the 2012–13 Hockey East All-Rookie Team. The following season he was named to the 2013–14 Hockey East Second All-Star Team, and in his junior year he was named to the 2014–15 Hockey East First All-Star Team. He scored a hat trick in his first-ever Beanpot Tournament game as a freshman in 2013. Roy's brother, Derick Roy, also played at Northeastern as a goaltender.

On April 8, 2016, the Anaheim Ducks announced Roy signed his first professional contract on a two-year entry-level contract with the team.

During the 2017–18 season, Roy was recalled from AHL affiliate, the San Diego Gulls, and made his NHL debut with the Ducks against the Vancouver Canucks on November 9, 2017, He scored his first NHL goal against the Boston Bruins on November 15, 2017.

On July 4, 2019, having left the Ducks as a free agent, Roy signed a one-year, two-way contract with the Florida Panthers. Roy began the 2019–20 season assigned to the Panthers AHL affiliate, the Springfield Thunderbirds, registering 14 points through 23 games before he was traded by the Panthers to the Pittsburgh Penguins in exchange for Ryan Haggerty on December 18, 2019. He played out the remainder of his contract to the Penguins in the AHL with the Wilkes-Barre/Scranton Penguins, scoring 10 goals and 21 points in 35 regular season games, before the season was cancelled due to the COVID-19 pandemic.

As a free agent from the Penguins, approaching the delayed 2020–21 season, Roy accepted a professional tryout invitation to attend the Tucson Roadrunners AHL training camp, on January 19, 2021. In the shortened season, Roy led the Roadrunners in scoring with 11 goals and 30 points in 35 regular season games.

On September 17, 2021, having left the Roadrunners as a free agent, Roy continued his career in the AHL in agreeing to a one-year deal with the Laval Rocket, the primary affiliate to the Montreal Canadiens.

Career statistics

Awards and honours

References

External links

1993 births
Living people
Anaheim Ducks draft picks
Anaheim Ducks players
Canadian ice hockey left wingers
Ice hockey people from Quebec
Laval Rocket players
Lincoln Stars players
Northeastern Huskies men's ice hockey players
San Diego Gulls (AHL) players
Sportspeople from Longueuil
Springfield Thunderbirds players
Tucson Roadrunners players
Wilkes-Barre/Scranton Penguins players
AHCA Division I men's ice hockey All-Americans